Sandfly may refer to:

Biology
Sandfly
Phlebotominae

Places
Sandfly, Georgia
Sandfly, Tasmania
Sandfly Colliery Tramway
Sandfly Bay
Sandfly, an island among the Nggela Islands of the Solomon Islands

Ships
HMS Sandfly, several ships

Animal common name disambiguation pages